Daron Payne (born May 27, 1997) is an American football defensive tackle for the Washington Commanders of the National Football League (NFL). He played college football at Alabama, where he won the 2018 College Football Playoff National Championship and was named its most valuable player on defense, before being drafted by Washington in the first round of the 2018 NFL Draft.

Early years
Payne attended Shades Valley High School in Birmingham, Alabama, where he played high school football for the Mounties. He was rated as a five-star recruit and committed to the University of Alabama to play college football.

College career
As a true freshman at Alabama in 2015, Payne had 13 tackles and half a sack. As a sophomore in 2016, he had 36 tackles and 1.5 sacks. In the National Championship Game against Clemson, he recorded five tackles and a half sack.

As a junior in 2017, Payne was named the defensive MVP of both postseason games that Alabama played. In the Sugar Bowl versus Clemson, he intercepted a ball and scored an offensive receiving touchdown on the resulting drive. In the National Championship Game against Georgia, Payne had six tackles to help lead Alabama to their second national championship in three seasons. After his junior year, Payne declared his intentions to enter the 2018 NFL Draft. During his time at Alabama, Payne's given name was commonly misspelled as Da'Ron, which he requested to change back to Daron for his professional career.

College statistics

Professional career

Payne was drafted by the Washington Redskins (Now the Washington Commanders) in the first round (13th overall) of the 2018 NFL Draft. On May 10, 2018, Payne signed a four-year contract worth 14.4 million featuring a $8.56 million signing bonus. He recorded his first career sack in Week 3 against the Green Bay Packers. He finished his rookie season with 56 tackles, five sacks, a forced fumble and fumble recovery, and was named to the 2018 PFWA All-Rookie Team as a result.

In Week 14 of the 2020 season against the San Francisco 49ers, Payne forced a fumble on quarterback Nick Mullens, which was recovered and returned for a touchdown by Chase Young and would also recover a forced fumble by Young. In Week 15 against the Seattle Seahawks, Payne recorded his first career interception off a pass thrown by Russell Wilson during the 20–15 loss. Payne finished the 2020 NFL season playing 880 snaps and recording 54 tackles, 3 sacks, 3 forced fumbles, and an interception. He also recorded two sacks against Tom Brady and the Tampa Bay Buccaneers in the Wild Card round of the playoffs.

The team exercised the fifth-year option on Payne's contract on April 27, 2021, which guarantees a salary of $8.529 million for the 2022 season. He was added to the COVID-19 reserve list on August 1, 2021, before being re-activated on August 5. Payne and defensive end James Smith-Williams sealed the Week 11 win over the Carolina Panthers after they sacked quarterback Cam Newton on fourth down with less than a minute and a half left in the game.

By Week 9 of the 2022 season, Payne accumulated a new career-high of 5.5 sacks. With 58 seconds remaining in the Week 12 game against the Atlanta Falcons, he deflected a touchdown pass attempt from Marcus Mariota which cornerback Kendall Fuller intercepted in the end zone in a 19-13 win. He finished the season having set new career highs with 64 tackles, 11.5 sacks, and five pass deflections. In January 2023, Payne was named as a replacement player for Aaron Donald to the 2023 Pro Bowl, his first Pro Bowl.

The Commanders placed a non-exclusive franchise tag on Payne before him signing a four-year, $90 million extension with the team on March 13, 2023.

References

External links
Washington Commanders bio
Alabama Crimson Tide bio

1997 births
Living people
Players of American football from Birmingham, Alabama
American football defensive tackles
Alabama Crimson Tide football players
Washington Commanders players
Washington Football Team players
Washington Redskins players
African-American players of American football
21st-century African-American sportspeople
National Conference Pro Bowl players